The Morning Never Came is the debut studio album by Finnish metal band Swallow the Sun, released on November 15, 2003.  Tracks 1, 3, 4 and 7 are all re-recorded versions from the band's first demo, Out of This Gloomy Light. The album was later released in the United States on February 22, 2005, via Olympic Recordings.

Track listing

U.S. & limited double vinyl edition bonus track

Personnel

Swallow the Sun
Mikko Kotamäki – vocals 
Markus Jämsen – lead guitar 
Juha Raivio – rhythm guitar; songwriting (1–8)
Matti Honkonen – bass guitar 
Aleksi Munter – keyboards 
Pasi Pasanen – drums

Additional personnel 
Flavia Lester – spoken word (5)
Petteri Kivimäki – photography
fo2003 – logo
Tuomo Lehtonen – album cover and layout
 Sami Kokko – recording, engineering and mixing (Sam's Workshop)
 Minerva Pappi – mastering at Finnvox Studios
Albert Witchfinder – guest vocals (9)

Arrangements (9)
Candlemass
Johan Längqvist
Christian Weberyd
Klas Bergwall
Leif Edling – songwriting
Mats Björkman
Mats Ekström

References

Swallow the Sun albums
2003 debut albums